"Precious" is the third single by Yuna Ito. It is the theme song to the movie Limit of Love: Umizaru (starring Hideaki Ito and Ai Kato) and was released on May 3, 2006. Both "I'm Free" and "Secrets" are more up-beat songs than "Precious".

"Precious" reached a peak of #2 on the daily charts and #3 on the weekly charts. The following week, her single stayed high on the charts and was #3 for the second week in a row. Her sales jumped from 39,000 copies the first week to 44,000 copies the second week. In two weeks, it has already surpassed the sales of her last single, "Faith/Pureyes".

This single has been billed as a double b-side single due to the fact it has 2 b-sides.

On the half-yearly charts of 2006, "Precious" was the 2nd most-downloaded song, 3rd most-downloaded ringtone, 5th most-downloaded PV, and overall (combined ranking for all 3 categories) ranked 2nd.

The PV (promotional video) for the title track "Precious" was shot in New Zealand, where Ito and her staff stayed for 5 days.

Despite the song being released for more than two years, it managed to climb back up the charts, with a peak of 17.

Track listing 
 Precious
 I’m Free
 Secrets
 Precious: Instrumental

Live performances
April 29, 2006 — CDTV - "Precious"
April 29, 2006 — Music Fair 21 - "Precious" + "Endless Story" 
May 5, 2006 — Music Station  - "Precious"
May 5, 2006 — Music Fighter  - "Precious"
May 26, 2006 — Music Station - "Precious"
November 20, 2006 — Best Hit Song Festival 2006 - "Precious"
December 6, 2006 — FNS Kayousai 2006 - "Precious"
December 16, 2006 — 39th Japan Cable Awards (Nihon Yusen Taisho) - "Precious"
December 29, 2006 — Sakigake Ongaku Banzuke - "Precious" and "Truth"
December 31, 2006 — CDTV 2006-2007 Special - "Precious"

Charts
Oricon Sales Chart (Japan)

References

2006 singles
2006 songs
Yuna Ito songs
Japanese film songs